David Judson Halley (born April 16, 1940) is an American archaeologist known for his work at several southeastern sites.  He retired from the University of Georgia in 2010 and currently resides in Athens, Georgia.

Early life
Hally was born on April 16, 1940 in Natick, Massachusetts. He attended Dartmouth for his undergraduate degree and was one of the first two students at Dartmouth to graduate with a major in anthropology. He then received his Masters and PhD in anthropology from Harvard University. He wrote his dissertation, which he did not finish until 1972, on his fieldwork from 1963-1964 in the Tensas Basin in northeastern Louisiana.

Academic career 
Hally was appointed assistant professor at the University of Georgia in  1967.  He worked there on various projects including one of his most important works, the King site, where he worked in 1974 and again from 1992-1993.  His work most often pertains to Mississippian life in chiefdoms of the southeastern United States and the pottery associated with these chiefdoms.  He has multiple publications    including Pottery Form and Function in American Antiquity published in 1986, and papers published separately in 1993 and 1996 describing chiefdoms.

Publications
 King: The Social Archaeology of a Late Mississippian Town in Northwestern Georgia. Tuscaloosa: University of Alabama Press, 2008.   In 167 libraries according to    
 (with James L. Rudolph)  Mississippi Period Archaeology of the Georgia Piedmont. Athens: University of Georgia, Dept. of Anthropology, 1986
 (with James B Langford)  Mississippi Period Archaeology of the Georgia valley and ridge province. Athens: University of Georgia, Dept. of Anthropology, 1988
Archaeological Investigation of the Potts' Tract Site (9-Mu-103), Carters Dam, Murray County, Georgia. Athens, Ga: Laboratory of Archaeology,   University of Georgia, 1970. OCLC 3108401
Review, by Christopher S Peebles: American Antiquity, Oct., 1975, vol. 40, no. 4, p. 504

References

Hally, David. Personal Interview. November, 2010.

1940 births
Living people
American archaeologists
Dartmouth College alumni
Harvard University alumni
People from Athens, Georgia
People from Natick, Massachusetts
University of Georgia faculty